The 2010 United States House of Representatives election in Vermont was held on November 2, 2010 and determined who would represent the state of Vermont in the United States House of Representatives. Democratic Congressman Peter Welch decided to run for a third term in Congress, facing Republican Paul D. Beaudry and two independent candidates. Welch won over his three opponents by a healthy margin, which allowed him to represent Vermont in the 112th Congress.

Democratic Primary

Candidates
Peter Welch, incumbent U.S. representative

Results

Republican Primary

Candidates
Paul D. Beaudry, radio talk show host
John M. Mitchell, businessman
Keith Stern, small businessman and 2006 independent Congressional candidate

Results

General election

Results

References

2010
Vermont
2010 Vermont elections